Gourab Sarkar is an Indian singer. He has participated SaReGaMaPa, a singing reality show which airs on Zee Bangla and he was the 1st runner-up of SaReGaMaPa 2019. He has sung many songs like Rakhbo Tomay Jotne Ami, Megh, Bijoyer Gaan, Eso Bondhu, Elo Maa Dugga, Manche Pherar Gaan, Algoche and many more.

Songs
 Rakhbo Tomay Jotne Ami
 Megh
 Bijoyer Gaan
 Eso Bondhu 
 Elo Maa Dugga
 Namuk Brishti
Manche pherar Gaan
Aalgoche
Mon Banjare Re

References

Living people
Bengali singers
21st-century Indian male singers
21st-century Indian singers
Year of birth missing (living people)
Singers from West Bengal